Wesley "Wes" Cutler (born February 17, 1911 in Toronto, Ontario, died June 10, 1956, in Toronto, Ontario) was a star football player in  the Canadian Football League for six seasons for the Toronto Argonauts. He was inducted into the Canadian Football Hall of Fame in 1968 and into the Canada's Sports Hall of Fame in 1975.

References
 Canada's Sports Hall of Fame profile

External links

1911 births
1956 deaths
Canadian football people from Toronto
Players of Canadian football from Ontario
Toronto Argonauts players
Toronto Varsity Blues football players
Canadian Football Hall of Fame inductees